Kshetrapa (Nepali:क्षेत्रपा) is a village development committee in north-eastern Nepal. As per the 2011 National Population and Housing Census, Kshetrapa had 2,447 (1,116 male and 1,331 female) people living in 580 individual households. Kshetrapa has one high school, Shree Kshetrawati Higher Secondary School, which is located at Peepal Daada, Majhgaun. Namdu Jugu Road, which runs through the village, is under construction .  

A seasonal bus service is available from Kathmandu, around 170 km (approximately 105 miles) away. The majority of the native population are of Jirel, Chettris, and Newar ethnic groups.

The original trailhead of all early Everest expeditions began at Kathmandu and passed through Kshetrapa; this is an alternative to the other route, which connect at Yarsa, Kavre, through Kiratichhap and heads to Jiri.

Villages

The following is a list of areas or sub-villages cities of Kshetrapa Village Development Committee:

Bhaankharka
Toriswaraa
Yebbo
Soluphuli
Toridanda
Thapagaun
Daardok
Dharmashala
Byaarok
Bagang
Paattle
Pipsul
Pokhari Parri
Majhgaun
Tengithoke
Pharthoke
Waithoke
Khulchi
Peepal Danda
Gechugaa
Tiltapsha
Gairaghar
Pakhaghar
Chhipigaun
Kshetrapa
Wollo Baseri
Pallo Baseri
Bethiswaraa
Pukti

References

External links
 UN map of the municipalities of Dolakha District
 

Populated places in Dolakha District